The 1927–28 William & Mary Indians men's basketball team represented the College of William & Mary as a member of Virginia Conference during the 1927–28 NCAA men's basketball season. Led by J. Wilder Tasker in his fifth and final season as head coach, the Indians compiled an overall record of 15–5 with a mark of 9–0 in conference play, winning the Virginia Conference title. This was the 23rd season of the collegiate basketball program at William & Mary, whose nickname is now the Tribe.

Schedule

|-
!colspan=9 style="background:#006400; color:#FFD700;"| Regular season

Source

References

William and Mary
William & Mary Tribe men's basketball seasons
William and Mary Indians basketball, men's
William and Mary Indians basketball, men's